The Los Angeles Meteorite is a martian meteorite fallen in California's Mojave Desert. Verish stored the meteorites in his rock collection before examining the find again on October 30, 1999 when he recognized it as a meteorite. He removed small samples for analysis by Alan Rubin at UCLA. By January 12, analysis confirmed the meteorite to be of Martian origin, similar to QUE 94201 found in the Antarctic in 1994.

Analysis at the time noted that the meteorite was "in many respects was the most geochemically evolved sample yet discovered from Mars."
A 2000 paper in the journal Geology described the meteorite as being "more differentiated, with higher concentrations of incompatible elements (e.g., La) and a higher abundance of late-stage phases such as phosphates and K-rich feldspathic glass" than previous Martian meteorites such as Shergotty and Zagami meteorites.

References

External links
 
 JPL description by Ron Baalke

Meteorites by name
Martian meteorites